Jaws of Death is a 2005 documentary by Gautam Saikia about animals at Kaziranga National Park being hit by vehicular traffic while crossing National Highway 37 in Assam state, India. The film is a winner of the Vatavaran Award.

References 

Goutom Saikia 

2005 films
Documentary films about nature
2005 documentary films